The Metropolitan School District of Decatur Township is a public school district located in Decatur Township, Indianapolis, Indiana.  It has an enrollment of 6,131 students in grades K-12 (one K early childhood center, five 1-6 elementary schools, one 7-8 middle school, and one 9-12 high school). There is also an alternative school run by the district. The district superintendent is Matthew J. Prusiecki, Ph.

Schools

High Schools (9-12)
Decatur Central High School

Middle Schools (7-8)
Decatur Middle School

Elementary (1st - 6th)
Stephen Decatur Elementary School
Valley Mills Elementary School
West Newton Elementary School
Blue Academy
Gold Academy

Early Childhood (Pre-K & K)
Liberty Early Elementary School

Alternative
Decatur Township School of Excellence

References

External links
 District Website

Decatur Township
Education in Indianapolis